is a former Japanese football player.

Playing career
Murata was born in Nagasaki Prefecture on May 12, 1969. After graduating from Chuo University, he joined his local club Mitsubishi Heavy Industries Nagasaki in Regional Leagues. In 1993, he moved to Japan Football League (JFL) club Yanmar Diesel (later Cerezo Osaka). The club won the champions in 1994 and was promoted to J1 League. Although he played as regular player until 1996, he could hardly play in the match in 1997. In 1998, he moved to JFL club Oita Trinity (later Oita Trinita). He played many matches and the club was promoted to J2 League from 1999. He retired end of 2000 season.

Club statistics

References

External links

1969 births
Living people
Chuo University alumni
Association football people from Nagasaki Prefecture
Japanese footballers
J1 League players
J2 League players
Japan Football League (1992–1998) players
Cerezo Osaka players
Oita Trinita players
Association football defenders
J3 League managers
Cerezo Osaka U-23 managers
Japanese football managers